Gonnelieu is a commune in the Nord department in northern France.

History 
During World War I, the town was captured by the German Empire during the Battle of Cambrai in 1917.

Heraldry

See also
Communes of the Nord department

References

Communes of Nord (French department)